Usechimorpha barberi is a species of ironclad beetle in the family Zopheridae. It is found in North America.

References

Further reading

 

Zopheridae
Articles created by Qbugbot
Beetles described in 1929